José Araquistáin Arrieta (born 4 March 1937) is a Spanish retired footballer who played as a goalkeeper.

Club career

Real Sociedad
Born in Azkoitia, Gipuzkoa, Araquistáin started his career with local Real Sociedad, playing five La Liga seasons with the club and being first-choice in four of those. He made his debut in the competition on 2 December 1956, in a 3–2 away win against Celta de Vigo.

Real Madrid
Araquistáin moved to Real Madrid for the 1961–62 season. He played 25 games in his first year, winning the double and the Ricardo Zamora Trophy in the process.

In the following years, Araquistáin was more often than not in the losing end of a battle for first-choice duties with José Vicente Train and Antonio Betancort. His best output came in the 1963–64 campaign, when he featured in 14 out of 30 league contests to help the Merengues to a third national championship in a row; on 11 May 1966, he appeared in one of his 18 European Cup matches, helping his team win that year's continental competition with a 2–1 triumph over FK Partizan.

Later years
Subsequently, Araquistáin represented Elche CF and CD Castellón, playing in the top flight with both sides and also attaining promotion from Segunda División with the latter. He retired in 1973, at the age of 36.

International career
Araquistáin earned six caps for Spain. He made his debut on 17 July 1960 in a 4–1 friendly win with Chile in Santiago, and was part of the squad that competed at the 1962 FIFA World Cup.

In the tournament, also held in Chile, Araquistáin played in the 1–2 group stage loss to Brazil, in an eventual group stage exit. It was to be his last international appearance.

Honours

Club
Real Madrid
La Liga: 1961–62, 1962–63, 1963–64, 1964–65, 1966–67, 1967–68
Copa del Generalísimo: 1961–62
European Cup: 1965–66

Individual
Zamora Trophy: 1961–62

References

External links

 
 
 
 
 Biography at Porteros Vascos de Leyenda 

1937 births
Living people
People from Azkoitia
Spanish footballers
Footballers from the Basque Country (autonomous community)
Association football goalkeepers
La Liga players
Segunda División players
Real Sociedad footballers
SD Eibar footballers
Real Madrid CF players
Elche CF players
CD Castellón footballers
Spain under-21 international footballers
Spain B international footballers
Spain international footballers
1962 FIFA World Cup players
UEFA Champions League winning players